Jonkvrouw/Freule Christine de Bosch Kemper (16 August 1840, Amsterdam - 12 May 1924, Amersfoort) was a Dutch writer.

, then Mennonite pastor at Amsterdam, baptised her in 1861.

She began to concentrate on the education of young women in 1867, and to further that purpose moved in 1880 from Amsterdam to Amersfoort, where she opened her house as a school to educate all classes of young women for free.  She and her sister Jeltje both championed women's rights, though Freule kept these ideas within her own circle.  She bequeathed her stately home to become an old people's home and her other property to be administered by Mennonite directors for the improvement of women's material condition, as the "Christine-Stichting Foundation".

A monument in Amersfoort was constructed in 1925 in memory of her social activities.

Sources
Global Anabaptist Mennonite Encyclopedia Online (GAMEO) entry

1840 births
1924 deaths
Dutch feminists
Dutch women writers
Writers from Amsterdam
Jonkvrouws of the Netherlands